League table for teams participating in Ykkönen, the second tier of the Finnish Soccer League system, in 1992.

League table

Replay for 2nd place: FinnPa Helsinki - JoKu Joutseno  3-1

Note: The three points per win system was introduced in Division One (and lower divisions) in 1992.

Promotion/relegation playoff

FC Oulu - FinnPa Helsinki  0-0
FinnPa Helsinki - FC Oulu  1-0

FinnPa Helsinki promoted, FC Oulu (formerly OTP Oulu, who merged with OLS Oulu) relegated.

See also
Veikkausliiga (Tier 1)

References

Ykkönen seasons
2
Finland
Finland